Miacora adolescens is a moth in the family Cossidae. It was described by Harrison Gray Dyar Jr. in 1914. It is found in Panama.

References

Arctiidae genus list at Butterflies and Moths of the World of the Natural History Museum

Cossinae
Moths described in 1914